Wilhelm Vischer (5 January 1890 in Basel – 2 June 1960 in Basel)  was a Swiss botanist whose areas of interest were algae and spermatophytes.

He studied medicine in Geneva and Basel, and natural sciences in Munich, where in 1914 he obtained his PhD. At the University of Munich, he was a student of Karl Ritter von Goebel. Following graduation, with Robert Hippolyte Chodat, he participated in a botanical excursion to Paraguay. After his return to Switzerland, he spent several years in Geneva (1914–1919), working on plants that were collected in Paraguay.

Beginning in 1919 he worked as a botanist at the rubber research station in Buitenzorg, Java. In 1924 he qualified as a lecturer at the University of Basel, where from 1928 to 1960, he served as an associate professor of botany.

In 1937 Adolf Pascher named the algae genus Vischeria in his honour.

Selected publications 
 La Végétation du Paraguay. Résultats Scientifiques d'une Mission Botanique Suisse au Paraguay, with Robert Hippolyte Chodat, 1927 (Google Books).
 Études mycologiques faites au Parc national suisse, Jules Favre, Wilhelm Vischer, Fritz Heinis, 1945.

References

External links 

 IPNI List of taxa described & co-described by Vischer.

20th-century Swiss botanists
Phycologists
1890 births
1960 deaths
Academic staff of the University of Basel
Scientists from Basel-Stadt